Brand of Fear is a 1949 American Western film directed by Oliver Drake and written by Basil Dickey. The film stars Jimmy Wakely, Dub Taylor, Tom London, Gail Davis, Marshall Reed and William Ruhl. The film was released on July 10, 1949, by Monogram Pictures.

Plot

Cast           
Jimmy Wakely as Jimmy Wakely
Dub Taylor as Cannonball 
Tom London as Blackjack Flint
Gail Davis as Anne Lamont
Marshall Reed as Cal Derringer
William Ruhl as Tom Slade
Mike Ragan as Butch Keeler 
Boyd Stockman as Jed Mailer
Myron Healey as Jeffers
Bob Curtis as Steve
Frank McCarroll as Larry
William Bailey as Frank Martin
Bill Potter as Mac 
Joe Galbreath as Nick

References

External links
 

1949 films
American Western (genre) films
1949 Western (genre) films
Monogram Pictures films
Films directed by Oliver Drake
American black-and-white films
1940s English-language films
1940s American films